The Ministry of Forestry and Mining and the Ministry of Agriculture and Waterworks Building, at 24–26 Kneza Miloša street in Belgrade is today the building of the Ministry of Foreign Affairs of the Republic of Serbia. It is one of the anthological achievements of Belgrade interwar architecture. At the time of the construction, it was one of the largest buildings in Belgrade, which by its size and appearance was supposed to represent the country and its interests.

Architecture 
In 1923, the construction of the building began after the designs of the architectural bureau "The Architect", under the supervision of the eminent authors, the architects, Dragiša Brašovana and Nikola Nestorovića. Since the future appearance of the object was inspired by the traditional Serbian-Byzantine style, at the initiative of the Ministry of Construction, the further construction was stopped in order not to spoil already established stylistic unity of the ambient. The further designing was assigned to one of the most important representatives of the academic style in the country, an architect of the Russian origin, Nikolaj Petrovič Krasnov. Without changing the basis, he made the new sketches of the facades and the plans for the luxurious interior and entire equipment. Until the end of the construction, architect Krasnov appears in the saved plans as the only author of this, spatially most comprehensive architectural creation, in the entire architectural opus. The monumental building is situated at the crossroad of the busy roads of Kneza Miloša Street and Nemanjina Street. It is marked by the exquisite dynamics of the facades, with the abundance of architectural plastic. The special contribution to the artistry of the facade was given by the works of the prominent sculptors Petar Palavičini. Dragomir Arambašić and Živojin Lukić. The relief and the free standing sculptures (male and female), symbolize the activities related to the offices of the ministries located in this building. The personification of the Forestry and the Reaper stand on the tops of the domes, while the Mining, Animal Husbandry, Vine Cultivation and many others are compositionally integrated with the rest parts of the object. 

The Ministry of Forestry and Mining and the Ministry of Agriculture and Waterworks has been designated as the cultural property.

See more 
List of cultural monuments in Belgrade

References

External links 
 Republički zavod za zaštitu spomenika kulture – Beograd
 Republički zavod za zaštitu spomenika kulture-Beograd/Baza nepokretnih kulturnih dobara
 Lista spomenika

Government buildings in Serbia
Buildings and structures in Belgrade
Office buildings in Serbia
1920s establishments in Serbia
Protected Monuments of Culture
Savski Venac